The Ambassador Extraordinary and Plenipotentiary of Kazakhstan to the United Kingdom is the official representative of the President and the Government of Kazakhstan to the Government of the United Kingdom. The diplomatic relations between the two countries were established on 19 January 1992 while the Kazakh Embassy was opened in February 1996. The current Ambassador is Erlan Idrissov who has been serving since 15 February 2017.

List of Ambassadors 

 Nurtai Abykayev (9 November 1995 – 7 September 1996)
 Kanat Saudabayev (14 November 1996 – 13 October 1999)
 Adil Ahmetov (28 April 2000 – November 2001)
 Erlan Idrissov (14 June 2002 – 4 July 2007)
 Qairat Abuisetov (17 January 2008 – 17 September 2014)
 Erzhan Kazykhanov (17 September 2014 – 15 February 2017)
 Erlan Idrissov (30 December 2016 – present)

See also
 Kazakhstan–United Kingdom relations
 List of ambassadors of the United Kingdom to Kazakhstan

References 

 
United Kingdom
Kazakhstan